The 1982–83 La Salle Explorers men's basketball team represented La Salle University as a member of the East Coast Conference during the 1982–83 NCAA Division I men's basketball season. The team was led by head coach Lefty Ervin and played their home games at The Palestra in Philadelphia, Pennsylvania. After finishing in a three-way tie atop the ECC East division standings, the Explorers won the ECC tournament to receive a bid to the NCAA tournament. As one of two No. 12 seeds in the East region, La Salle defeated Boston University in the Play-in round before losing to No. 5 seed VCU in the first round. The team finished with a record of 18–14 (7–2 ECC).

Roster

Schedule and results

|-
!colspan=9 style=| Regular season

|-
!colspan=9 style=| ECC Tournament

|-
!colspan=9 style=| NCAA Tournament

References

La Salle Explorers men's basketball seasons
La Salle Explorers
La Salle
La
La